Ramon Edgar (Ray) Moore was an American mathematician, known for his pioneering work in the field of interval arithmetic.

Moore received an AB degree in physics from the University of California, Berkeley in 1950, and a PhD in mathematics from Stanford University in 1963. His early career included work on the earliest computers (including ENIAC). He was awarded the Humboldt Research Award for U.S. senior scientists twice, in 1975 and 1980.

His most well known work is his first book, Interval Analysis, published in 1966. He wrote several more books and many journal articles and technical reports.

R. E. Moore Prize 
The R. E. Moore Prize for Applications of Interval Analysis is an award in the interdisciplinary field of rigorous numerics. It is awarded biennially by the Computer Science Department at the University of Texas at El Paso, and judged by the editorial board of the journal Reliable Computing. The award was named in honor of Moore's contributions to interval analysis.

Laureates

See also
 List of mathematics awards

References

Further reading

External links 
 
 Faculty webpage
 R. E. Moore Prize
 

20th-century American mathematicians
Mathematics awards
Stanford University alumni
University of California, Berkeley alumni
University of Texas at El Paso faculty
1929 births
2015 deaths
21st-century American mathematicians